Asian Institute of Tourism is one of the colleges under the University of the Philippines System and is located at the UP Diliman campus.

History 

Founded on February 26, 1976, the Asian Institute of Tourism (AIT) began as a tripartite project of the Department of Tourism, the Philippine Tourism Authority (now the Tourism Infrastructure and Enterprise Zone Authority), and the University of the Philippines as approved by former President Ferdinand Marcos. The institute is considered to be the pioneer in tourism education in Asia being the first academic institution in the region to offer a four-year degree program leading to a Bachelor of Science in Tourism.

The AIT complex, where the institute is currently housed, was inaugurated on November 20, 1978. This edifice was one of the pet projects of First Lady Imelda Marcos.

The institute attracted an initial batch of 28 students in June 1977 and then produced its first batch of graduates, 12 students, in March 1979.

The institute performs the three basic functions: teaching, research, and extension.

Academic program 

AIT offers a four-year baccalaureate degree which focuses on the fields of tourism principles, geography and culture, tourism planning and development, business management and entrepreneurship, accounting and finance, laws, marketing and promotions, airline operations, travel and tour operations, hotel and resort operations, and tourism research.

In 2018, the institute also began offering a graduate certificate and a master's degree in tourism development and management. 

The institute also offers research and extension services to local government units around the country, particularly in the fields of tourism planning and development.

The curriculum of AIT is believed to be the basis of other tourism curricula of tourism schools in the Philippines. The institute is also said to have pioneered the practice of integrating a hotel laboratory in its instruction.

Deans 

 Prof. Daniel Corpuz (1988–1991)
 Prof. Evangeline Ortiz (1991–2001)
 Prof. Reil Cruz (2001–2004)
 Dr. Corazon Rodriguez (2004–2010)
 Dr. Miguela Mena (2010–present)

Faculty 

As of AY 2008–2009, the Institute had 14 full-time university faculty and 17 lecturers from the industry.

Students 

As of second semester, AY 2009–2010, the institute had 385 students.

Images

References 

University of the Philippines Diliman
Tourism agencies
Educational institutions established in 1976
1976 establishments in the Philippines